Marat may refer to:

People

Marat (given name)
Marat (surname)
Jean-Paul Marat (1743-1793), French political theorist, physician and scientist

Arts, entertainment, and media
Marat/Sade, a 1963 play by Peter Weiss
Marat/Sade (film), a 1967 adaptation by Adrian Mitchell
The Death of Marat, a 1793 painting
Il piccolo Marat, an opera

Places
 Marat (Phoenicia), a former Phoenician town now known as Amrit, Syria
 Marat, Puy-de-Dôme, a commune in France
 Marat Fjord, Severnaya Zemlya
 Marat Shahr, a village in Mazandaran Province, Iran

Ships
 Marat (ex-Petropavlovsk), a Soviet battleship
 Marat, the French name of HMS Belleisle

See also
Murat (disambiguation)